Hills Adventist College is an independent Seventh-day Adventist co-educational early learning, primary and secondary day school, located across two campuses in Sydney's Hills District, New South Wales, Australia. Enrolments at the College during 2016 totalled 566 students. The junior school, comprising an early learning centre and teaching facilities for students in Year K to Year 4 is located in Castle Hill; and the senior school, comprising teaching facilities for students in Year K and Year 5 to Year 12, is located in Kellyville. The College is a part of the Seventh-day Adventist education system, the world's second largest Christian school system.

Curriculum
The schools curriculum consists primarily of the standard courses taught at college preparatory schools across the world. All students are required to take classes in the core areas of English, Basic Sciences, Mathematics, a Foreign Language, and Social Sciences.

Spiritual aspects
All students are required to take part in Bible classes from Year K to Year 10, and then Studies of Religion (SOR) a 2-unit NSW HSC course is mandatory in Year 11 and 12. The Bible classes cover topics in biblical history and Bible characters and themes and other Christian doctrines. Weekly, the entire student body gathers together for a chapel service. Outside the classrooms there is year-round spiritually oriented programming that relies on student involvement.

Sport
The College is part of the Independent Schools Association inter-school sports program - and as such - students have the opportunity to compete at local, regional, state and national levels - depending on their abilities - in sports of their choice and interest.

See also

 List of Seventh-day Adventist secondary schools
 Seventh-day Adventist education
 List of non-government schools in New South Wales

References 

1961 establishments in Australia
Adventist secondary schools in Australia
Educational institutions established in 1961
Private secondary schools in Sydney
Adventist primary schools in Australia
Castle Hill, New South Wales
Private primary schools in Sydney